Do You Know That Little House on Lake Michigan? is a 1929 Czech-German silent film directed by Max W. Kimmich and starring Margot Landa, Václav Norman, and Sasa Dobrovolná. The film's action takes place in the United States.

Cast

References

Bibliography

External links

1929 films
Czech silent films
Films of the Weimar Republic
German silent feature films
Films directed by Max W. Kimmich
Films set in the United States
German black-and-white films
Czech black-and-white films